Hydroxyuracil may refer to:

 Barbituric acid (6-hydroxyuracil)
 5-Hydroxyuracil, an oxidized form of cytosine